Jordan Yale Levine (born January 7, 1985) is an American film producer and founding partner of Yale Productions. He has worked as a producer on a number of films, including King Cobra by director Justin Kelly, and After Everything by directors Hannah Marks and Joey Power.

Early life
Levine was born in Long Island. He attended G.W. Hewlett High School in Hewlett, New York before graduating in 2003.

Career 
He produced his first movie at 19 years old before founding his own company, Yale Productions, in 2012. Between producing, financing, and distribution, Levine has been involved in the production of over 30 films and was named as one of Variety's 10 Producers to Watch in 2016.

Levine recently secured an investment for Yale Productions in 2019 from The Forest Road Company.

While production companies have taken a hit during the COVID-19 pandemic, Yale Productions was able to push forward with its release of Becky. The film made $205,797 from 45 theaters in its opening weekend, finishing second among reported films. It made $192,138 from 50 theaters in its second weekend, becoming the first film to officially top The Wretched at the box office.

Festivals 
Levine has produced many films that have premiered at various festivals. He made his debut at Tribeca Film Festival in 2016 with King Cobra and was set to return to Tribeca Film Festival in 2020 for the premiere of Becky but the festival was canceled due to the COVID-19 Pandemic. Another recently produced film, I Used to Go Here was to premiere at the SXSW in 2020 but that was also shut down due to the COVID-19 Pandemic.

Owing to his experience at film festivals, Levine was interviewed by the Hollywood Reporter to give the inside scoop on the American Film Market in 2017.

Filmography 
He was producer for all films unless otherwise noted.

Film

As an actor

Miscellaneous crew

References

External links 
 

1985 births
Living people
American film producers